Cerruti 1881, also known as Cerruti, is a French luxury fashion house founded in 1967 in Paris by the Italian stylist and fashion producer Nino Cerruti. It was named "1881" because Nino's grandfather established the family woolen mill, Fratelli Cerruti Wool Mill, in Italy in 1881.

In 1967, Nino Cerruti founded the Cerruti fashion house, with headquarters at 3 Place de la Madeleine in Paris, and opened his first shop at 27 rue Royale in Paris. The headquarters of the company is still located on rue Royale.

In August 2006, the company was acquired by American firm MatlinPatterson Global Advisors. 

In December 2010, the company was bought by Chinese clothing retailer Trinity Limited.

History 
In 1881, the grandfather of Nino Cerruti founded the textile mill Lanificio Fratelli Cerruti. Located in Biella (Piemonte, Italy), the water in the region is put to use to wash and treat the wool, which is imported principally from Australia and South Africa, so as to develop flannel, tweeds, cashmere, and butter muslin. Nino Cerruti took over the family business after his father's death in 1950. Cerruti fabrics are still produced in the same workshops.

The Cerruti label was launched in 1967 with a menswear collection. In 1976, the line 'Cerruti Woman' was created. Before creating his own brand in 1974, Giorgio Armani had worked in Paris under Cerruti.

In 1978, the house launched its first fragrance with Nino Cerruti pour Homme. This was followed by numerous other fragrances for both men and women, such as Fair Play in 1985, Cerruti 1881 pour Homme in 1990, Cerruti Image in 1998 and l'Essence de Cerruti in 2008.

During the 1980s, Cerruti began producing clothes for films. See Cinema and Cerruti for details.

In 1994, Cerruti was the official designer of the famous Scuderia Ferrari.

In October 2000, Nino Cerruti sold his brand to Italian investors and got back to the family business of his grandfather, Lanificio Fratelli Cerruti, dal 1881. His departure came after the full takeover of the company by Fin.part.

In autumn 2001, Fin.Part installed Roberto Menichetti, who previously was responsible for the creative revival of Burberry, as a creative director.  Menichetti left the house of fashion after only one season and was replaced by Istvan Francer, a former DKNY designer. Francer stayed on for two seasons. In spring 2003, David Cardona, who had worked for Richard Tyler and Chrome Hearts, replaced Istvan Francer as a creative director at Cerruti. Scotsman Adrian Smith was appointed head of the menswear collections. By 2004, Fin.part was in a deep financial crisis and declared bankruptcy in 2005. In the same year the Cerruti brand survived unsuccessful takeover attempt by another Italian menswear manufacturer - Manifattura Paolini.

In August 2006, Cerruti was finally sold to American private equity firm MatlinPatterson. MatlinPatterson intended to revitalize the Cerruti brand by taking on Nicolas Andreas Taralis, a former designer with Dior, who also owned his signature fashion label Homme. He was appointed creative director in the summer of the same year.

In October 2007, Taralis was replaced by Belgian Jean Paul Knott, a former Krizia, Yves Saint Laurent, and Louis Féraud designer who also owned an eponymous fashion label. Knott had originally been hired by Taralis to oversee the label's diffusion line Cerruti 1881 in March 2007.

Products 

The Cerruti house designs, manufactures, distributes, and retails luxury ready-to-wear, jeans, fragrances, sportswear, leather goods, watches, and accessories. It offers three lines, each for men and women: Cerruti (top line), Cerruti 1881 (diffusion line) and 18CRR81 (sportswear). Other highly specialized sub-labels including Cerruti Jeans, Cerruti Parfums.

Fragrances
 1978 	Nino Cerruti (M)
 1985 	Fair Play (M)
 1987 	Nino Cerruti pour femme (F)
 1990 	Cerruti 1881 (M)
 1995 	Cerruti 1881 (F)
 1998 	Cerruti Image (F)
 2000 	Cerruti Image (M)
 2002 	Cerruti 1881 Amber (M)
 2003 	Cerruti 1881 Eau d'Eté (F)
 2004 	Cerruti Sí (M)
 2006 	Cerruti 1881 – Black (M)
 2006 	Cerruti 1881 pour femme – White (F)
 2008 	L'Essence de Cerruti (M)

Stores
As of 6 May 2021, Cerruti 1881 has 84 stores in 34 cities in China, Hong Kong, Macau and Taiwan.

In the past, there were Cerruti 1881, 18CRR81 and Cerruti stores throughout the world in Milan, Cosenza, Madrid, London, Kuala Lumpur, Chennai, Munich, Stockholm, Athens, Birmingham, Riyadh, Moscow, New York, Hong Kong, Taipei, Jakarta, and Tokyo among other locations.

From July 2009 to May 2010, the flagship store at Place de la Madeleine closed its door for renovation. The design was contracted to the French architect Christian Biecher. The inauguration was launched with the presence of the founder Nino Cerruti.

Cinema and Cerruti 
Nino Cerruti created exclusive clothes for films and actors, since he first dressed French actor Jean-Paul Belmondo in 1965. Some of his contributions include:

 1985 – The Jewel of the Nile, Michael Douglas
 1987 – The Witches of Eastwick, Jack Nicholson
 1987 – Fatal attraction, Michael Douglas
 1987 – Wall Street, Michael Douglas
 1990 – Pretty Woman, Richard Gere
 1991 – Silence of the Lambs, Scott Glenn
 1992 – Basic Instinct, Michael Douglas
 1993 – Philadelphia, Tom Hanks
 1993 – Indecent Proposal, Robert Redford
 1994 – Prêt-à-Porter, Marcello Mastroianni
 1997 – As good as it gets, Jack Nicholson
 1997 – Air Force One, Harrison Ford
 2000 – American Psycho, Christian Bale

Sports and Cerruti 
Cerruti also used the power of communication in sports and its champions, dressed players of different sports:

 Ski – Ingemar Stenmark
 Tennis – Jimmy Connors, Mats Wilander
 Football – Jean Pierre Papin 
 Car Racing – Jean Alesi, Ferrari Team, Gerhard Berger, Jacques Villeneuve, Michael Schumacher

See also 
 Nino Cerruti
 High Fashion

References

External links 
 

Clothing companies of France
Fashion accessory brands
Luxury brands
High fashion brands
Eyewear companies of France
Eyewear brands of France
Watch manufacturing companies of France
French companies established in 1967
Clothing companies established in 1967
Design companies established in 1967
Companies based in Paris
2006 mergers and acquisitions
2010 mergers and acquisitions
1967 establishments in France